The 1905 Massachusetts gubernatorial election was held on November 7, 1905. Incumbent Democratic Governor William L. Douglas did not run for re-election. Republican Lt. Governor Curtis Guild Jr. won the open election, defeating attorney Charles W. Bartlett.

General election

Results

Governor

See also
 1905 Massachusetts legislature

References

Governor
1905
Massachusetts
November 1905 events